Blaine Rydman (born December 16, 1949) is a Canadian former professional ice hockey defenceman.

During the 1972–73 and 1973–74 seasons, Rydman played 39 games in the World Hockey Association with the New York Raiders and Minnesota Fighting Saints.

References

External links

1949 births
Living people
Baltimore Clippers players
Canadian ice hockey defencemen
Cape Codders players
Charlotte Checkers (EHL) players
Erie Blades players
Estevan Bruins players
Ice hockey people from Saskatchewan
Long Island Ducks (ice hockey) players
Minnesota Fighting Saints players
New Haven Blades players
New York Raiders players
Sportspeople from Weyburn
Suncoast Suns (SHL) players
Winston-Salem Polar Twins (SHL) players
Winston-Salem Thunderbirds players